Monica Sjöö (31 December 1938 – 8 August 2005) was a Swedish-born British-based painter, writer and radical anarcho/ eco-feminist who was an early exponent of the Goddess movement. Her books and paintings were foundational to the development of feminist art in Britain, beginning at the time of the founding of the women's liberation movement around 1970.

Sjöö's most famous painting is God Giving Birth (1968), which depicts a woman giving birth and was inspired by Sjöö's religious view of motherhood; it sparked some protests from Christian groups in the 1970s. She wrote or co-wrote the manifesto Towards a Revolutionary Feminist Art (1971) and The Great Cosmic Mother: Rediscovering the Religion of the Earth (1987).

Sjöö's art and writing became well-known outside of the UK, and throughout the 1970s, 1980s and 1990s she corresponded with influential American writers, artists and pagans such as Jean and Ruth Mountaingrove, Starhawk, Zsuzsanna Budapest, Lucy Lippard, Alice Walker, and Judy Chicago.

Early life 
Her parents were the Swedish painters Gustaf Arvid Sjöö (1902–1949) and Anna Harriet Rosander-Sjöö (1912–1965), who divorced when Sjöö was three years old. She left school and ran away from home when she was 16. 

Sjöö traveled Europe and held a variety of jobs: she worked in vineyards and as a nude model at art schools in Paris and Rome. She first came to Britain in the late 1950s, and eventually settled in Bristol where – except for a period in Wales in the early 1980s – she lived for the rest of her life.

Career 

Sjöö was the main author of Towards a Revolutionary Feminist Art (1971) one of the first, and most militant, feminist art manifestos. It was discussed widely in the feminist press, and The Guardian published an article in response.

Sjöö wrote the original pamphlet that, with Barbara Mor's re-write and expansion, would become the book The Great Cosmic Mother (1987). It covers women's ancient history and the origin of religion, and is one of the first books to propose that humanity's earliest religious and cultural belief systems were created and first practised by women. It is currently in print and has been, and still is, a part of many women's studies, mythology and religious studies syllabi. Her research and writing helped uncover the hidden history of the Goddess. Sjöö's successful use of interdisciplinarity in her research has led to its acclaim within the Goddess movement.

Early exhibitions 
Sjöö's first exhibition was at the Gallery Karlsson in Stockholm, Sweden in 1967. Having been a founder member of the Bristol Women's Liberation group, in March 1971, she participated in the first "Women's Liberation Art Group" exhibition held at the Woodstock Gallery in London.

Margaret Harrison (1977) states that [on one occasion in 1970 several of Sjöö's paintings were banned from being shown in St. Ives during the St. Ives festival]. (...) "Monica then wrote in Socialist Woman (Nottingham) proposing forming a group or alliance of women artists. This led to the formation of the Bristol Women's Art Group (...)".

Later exhibitions 

Sjöö used imagery in her paintings which often references birth, the female body, and nature. All of these images were central to her beliefs regarding her "Cosmic Mother".  She described herself as among the pioneers in this movement of reclaiming female divinity – along with many other writers, artists, poets, and thinkers. In her art, she attempted to "holistically express" her growing religious belief in the Great Mother as the cosmic spirit and generative force in the universe. This was a critical component of her artwork. She claimed to enter a "state" of being or of mind where knowledge was available from past, present, and future. 

Sjöö's most famous painting, God Giving Birth (1968), depicts a woman giving birth, and has the title text painted in red capitalized letters. It is an expression of Sjöö's spiritual journey at that time, inspired by her religious experience during the birth of her second son, and represents her perception of the Great Mother as the universal creator of cosmic life. The painting and its concept created some controversy among Christian groups in the 1970s; at a group exhibition in London in 1973, it led to Sjöö being reported to the police for blasphemy, although the case was not taken up by the court.

Beliefs 

Sjöö's work and beliefs centered on her respect and care of the Goddess, or Mother Earth. The Goddess was "the beauty of the green earth, the life-giving waters, the consuming fires, the radiant moon, and the fiery sun". Sjöö's respect for nature and the environment was not mere belief but, for her, a spiritual truth. The Goddess / Earth is to be respected as the life giver. This respect is to be found not only in her imagery, but in two texts which chronicle her journey through the written word.

Yet, these abstract beliefs were grounded with a firm foundation of action and activism. She was involved with the anarchist and anti-Vietnam War movements in Sweden in the 1960s and was active in the women's movement in Britain. Her political activism always grew out of her spiritual understanding of the earth as our living mother, similar to the beliefs of some Native American peoples.

Sjöö was highly critical of many of the ideas and personages of the New Age movement, including Alice Bailey, J. Z. Knight and "Ramtha", and Gene Roddenberry for some of the ideas behind Star Trek.

Reception

Starhawk described Sjöö's work as paintings that "transformed ancient images and symbols into contemporary icons of female power." 
In 1976 Sjöö was the subject of a film documentary shown at the ICA and NFT.

Personal life 
Sjöö believed heterosexuality was an unnatural state imposed by patriarchy, and later in her life she enjoyed a number of intimate romantic relationships with women. (In the context of the 1980 essay by Adrienne Rich, "Compulsory Heterosexuality and Lesbian Existence".) However, after separating from her second husband, Andy Jubb, a composer, in the mid 1970s, Sjöö had an intense relationship with Keith Paton, a founder of the Alternative Socialist movement and, like Sjöö herself, a regular contributor to the alternative press, especially Peace News. Under Sjöö's influence, Paton changed his name to Motherson (or Mothersson).

Two of her three sons died young. In 1985 her youngest, Leify, was killed in front of her by an oncoming car at age 15. Her eldest son, Sean, died of non-Hodgkin's lymphoma in 1987, aged 28. She claimed that his death was exacerbated by his experiences of rebirthing. Sjöö's grief at this double loss led first to an artistic paralysis akin to writer's block, and then to artistic expression, in the shape of the painting My Sons in the Spirit World (1989).

Sjöö died of cancer in 2005, aged 66.

Artwork

Exhibitions

Locations 
Some of her works are currently held in private collections of individuals: Sig Lonegren, Alice Walker, and Genevieve Vaughan hold a few, while Maggie Parks holds most of her art. The Temple of Goddess Spirituality dedicated to Sekhmet holds Solar Lionheaded Sekhment of Primordial Fire (1992, oil on hardboard) where it is displayed in the living room of their guest house.

Written works

The Great Cosmic Mother 
  (Original pamphlet)
 
 
 
 
 Excerpted in:

Books

Chapters 

—— (1983). "Aspects of the Great Mother" and "Creation". In Garcia, Jo; Maitland, Sara. Walking on the Water: Women Talk About Spirituality. London: Virago.

Articles 

 
 

 
 Excerpted in: (2001). In Robinson, Hilary. Feminism Art Theory: An Anthology 1968–2000. Malden, MA: Blackwell. .
 (2015). In Robinson, Hilary. Feminism Art Theory: An Anthology 1968–2014. Malden, MA: Wiley Blackwell. .

Poems

Pamphlets 
  Reprinted in "Towards a Revolutionary Feminist Art"

References

Bibliography
 The Great Cosmic Mother - Rediscovering the Religion of the Earth, co-authored with Barbara Mor, Harper & Row (1987)
 The Norse Goddess, Dor Dama Press, Meyn Mamvro Publications (2000)
 Return of the Dark/Light Mother or New Age Armageddon? – Towards a Feminist Vision of the Future, Plain View Press (1999)
 Spiral Journey, Antenna Publications (2019)

Further reading 
 White, Rupert (2018) Monica Sjöö: Life and Letters 1958-2005 Antenna Publications

External links
 Monica Sjöö's archived website
 Archived papers at the University of Bristol Library Special Collections
 Monica Sjöö's art in the New Hall Art Collection  of Murray Edwards College at the University of Cambridge

1938 births
2005 deaths
Deaths from cancer in England
20th-century Swedish painters
21st-century Swedish painters
Swedish women painters
Swedish feminists
Swedish anarchists
Feminist artists
Radical feminists
Ecofeminists
Anarcha-feminists
Swedish anti-war activists
Anti–Vietnam War activists
Swedish anti–nuclear weapons activists
Swedish modern pagans
Modern pagan artists
Modern pagan writers
Swedish emigrants to the United Kingdom